The M-45 is a highway bypass built in the Community of Madrid of regional importance. It begins at Exit 28-B of the M-40 highway, in Carabanchel, and ends at Coslada, where it joins with the M-50 . The highway connects two national highways , the A-2 and A-5 .

The M-45 was considered the best highway in Madrid in terms of safety and fluidity from a survey conducted in 2003 by the Ministry of Public Works, Town Planning and Transport of the Community of Madrid. It was also the first road to use the financing system known as "shadow toll", giving rise to the completion of legal studies on this figure. The June 7, 2012, the Regional President Esperanza Aguirre announced before the end of 2012 this highway would become direct toll due to high maintenance costs as well as due to economic problems of the regional government. The cost to the Madrid government is 8 cents per kilometer and car, and 2.64 euros for each vehicle passing through all the way.

Planning and construction
For the purpose of construction, the highway was divided into three sections totaling 37 kilometers, 2 each way to clinching Joint Venture Company different. The award was made by negotiated and the construction was funded by the so-called shadow toll procedure.

It opened on March 14 of 2002, 2 soon circulated around her half of 72,000 vehicles, easing the Autopista de Circunvalación M-40M-40 and M-50 at 40,000 cars. 6 In 2011 recorded an average daily traffic of 96,913 vehicles a day in its section more busy, between Leganés and Getafe. 7

The use of shadow toll as a means of funding has been controversial. The group of United Left in the Assembly of Madrid argues that is a significant increase for public spending. According to a report carried out, the cost in 25 years of the work of the highway would amount to 1,838 million euros , while direct execution had not exceeded 600 million. The responsible Ministry, ruled by the Popular Party, defended the system and said that the own Ministry of Public Works planned to use it.

Average Daily Traffic (ADT)
The detail of the average daily traffic in 2011, according to "Traffic Management Study on the roads of the Community of Madrid" published by the Community of Madrid, is as follows:

Concessions
The award is divided into three sections. The remuneration to the concession is made by the shadow toll method.

Exits

See also
 M-30
 M-40
 M-50
 Área metropolitana de Madrid
 Anexo:Carreteras de la Comunidad de Madrid
 Anexo:Autopistas y autovías de España

References

External links

Transport in Madrid
Transport in the Community of Madrid
Ring roads in Spain